Ali Hadi Mohsin (1 June 1967 – 12 June 2020) was an Iraqi professional football player and manager. He played as a defender for Al-Zawraa and Al-Talaba, winning several titles with the clubs; he also played in Lebanon, for Al-Safa and Al-Ahed.

Hadi also coached Al-Quwa Al-Jawiya in the 2016 AFC Cup, and led the Iraq national under-17 team to qualification for the 2018 AFC U-16 Championship.

Club career 
Hadi began his senior career in 1988 at Al-Zawraa, staying there six years; he won four Iraqi Premier League titles. Hadi moved to Al-Talaba in 1994. In 1996 Hadi moved to Lebanon, playing for Al-Safa, before joining Al-Ahed the following season.

Managerial career 
Hadi was part of the technical staff of the Iraq national under-20 team, that finished in fourth place at the 2013 FIFA U-20 World Cup in Turkey. He also coached Al-Quwa Al-Jawiya in the 2016 AFC Cup, and led the Iraq national under-17 team to qualification for the 2018 AFC U-16 Championship.

Death 
On 7 June 2020, Hadi was admitted into the Baghdad Hospital, after contracting COVID-19 during the COVID-19 pandemic in Iraq. On 12 June 2020, Hadi was pronounced dead at 53 years of age.

Managerial statistics

References

External links
 
 

1967 births
2020 deaths
Sportspeople from Baghdad
Iraqi footballers
Association football defenders
Al-Zawraa SC players
Al-Talaba SC players
Safa SC players
Al Ahed FC players
Al-Karkh SC players
Iraqi Premier League players
Lebanese Premier League players
Iraqi football managers
Karbalaa FC managers
Zakho FC managers
Al-Kahrabaa FC managers
Al-Quwa Al-Jawiya managers
Al-Talaba SC managers
Iraqi Premier League managers
Iraqi expatriate footballers
Iraqi expatriate sportspeople in Lebanon
Expatriate footballers in Lebanon
Deaths from the COVID-19 pandemic in Iraq